Thelypodium integrifolium is a species of flowering plant in the mustard family known by the common names entireleaved thelypody and foxtail thelypodium. It is native to much of the western United States, including the Great Basin and surrounding plateaus and deserts.

It occurs in several types of habitat, often growing in sandy, mineral-rich, and alkaline soils, such as those on playas.

Description
Thelypodium integrifolium is a biennial herb producing a hairless, waxy stem with a thick, sturdy base, unbranched or branching toward the top and sometimes becoming quite tall, approaching three meters in maximum height. The thick, waxy leaves are not compound or lobed, having smooth edges. The largest basal leaves may exceed 30 centimeters in length. Leaves higher on the plant are shorter and are smooth-edged or toothed.

The inflorescence is a dense, cylindrical, spikelike raceme of white or purplish flowers. The fruit is a silique which may be 8 centimeters long.

Subspecies
There are five subspecies:
T. i. ssp. affine - white petals - Mojave Desert (California), Great Basin.
T. i. ssp. complanatum - mainly limited to the Great Basin; generally with lavender petals.
T. i. ssp. gracilipes - native to the Four Corners region
T. i. ssp. integrifolium - widespread in the northern distribution of the species
T. i. ssp. longicarpum - endemic to Arizona, where it is known only from the Grand Canyon and vicinity

References

External links
Jepson Manual Treatment: Thelypodium integrifolium
U.C. Photo gallery: Thelypodium integrifolium ssp. affine

integrifolium
Flora of the Northwestern United States
Flora of the Southwestern United States
Flora of Arizona
Flora of California
Flora of Nevada
Flora of the Great Basin
Flora of the California desert regions
Flora without expected TNC conservation status